Spectrum Games is the trading name of a small company that designs role-playing games (RPGs). 

It was founded in 2000 (as Spectrum Game Studios, which is still the company's legal name) by Cynthia Celeste Miller and Sabrina Belle (the latter of whom is no longer involved).  In 2002, Eddy Webb was brought into the fold and soon became vice-president.  Two of the products created by the company have been nominated for the Indie Game Awards, Origins Awards, and the ENnie Awards.

External links
Spectrum Games home page

Role-playing game publishing companies
Companies established in 2000